Danylo Artemovych Safonov (born 21 January 2002) is a Ukrainian professional footballer who plays as a centre-back for Ukrainian club Kramatorsk.

References

External links
 
 

2002 births
Living people
Footballers from Kramatorsk
Ukrainian footballers
Association football defenders
FC Kramatorsk players
Ukrainian First League players